Ballston Quarter, formerly known as Ballston Common Mall, originally opened as Parkington Shopping Center, was one of the first major suburban shopping centers in the Washington, D.C., area.  It opened in 1951 and was the nation's first shopping center built around a multi-story parking garage. It is located at the intersection of Glebe Road and Wilson Boulevard in the Ballston neighborhood of Arlington County, Virginia, two blocks from Ballston–MU station on the Washington Metro's Orange and Silver lines. 

The Ballston Common Mall opened October 20, 1986 as a $40 million replacement for Parkington Shopping Center. The  center was developed in limited partnership with May Centers, a subsidiary of The May Department Stores Company which, at the time, also owned one of the anchors, Hecht's. On May 31, 2016, most businesses closed so the mall could be redeveloped into Ballston Quarter. It reopened officially in November 2018. Currently, Macy's, Regal Cinemas, and a gym are the major anchors.

History 
The $6.5 million Hecht's store opened in the Parkington Shopping Center on November 2, 1951.  At its opening, the five story,  store was the largest suburban department store on the East Coast. A man was electrocuted during the construction of the store.  Over the years, the $15 million Parkington Shopping Center expanded to 30 stores including Giant Food, McCrory Stores, W. T. Grant, Brentano's Books, Casual Corner, and others.  In May 1974, JCPenney opened a  soft line merchandise and catalog store.

By 1982, the 30-year-old Parkington Shopping Center was in need of a facelift.  Beginning that year, Arlington County and the May Centers embarked on a $100 million renovation project and expansion of the shopping center. Part of the project was a contest among Arlington residents to name the new mall. That contest was how "Ballston Common" came to be the mall's name.  After some complications, the renovated and expanded shopping center opened in the fall of 1986.  In the early 2000s, the mall became home to the MedStar Capitals Iceplex, the headquarters and practice facility for the National Hockey League's Washington Capitals, and the ComedySportz improvisational theatre organization.

Redevelopment 
The owner of the mall started planning its redevelopment in 2013. In September 2013, Forest City Washington purchased the Macy's Furniture Store as part of that plan. The mall's final day of operation was May 31, 2016. A number of stores stayed open during the renovation.

Shooting 
On September 14, 2019, the Arlington County Police Department was dispatched to the mall due to reports of a mass shooter. After the mall was searched, it was revealed that there was no shooter. It was suspected to be a prank, but it was later found out that someone misinterpreted the line "Pennywise has sharpshooter activated," while they were watching the movie It Chapter Two at the theatre. The report summoned a massive police presence with police helicopters from Washington, D.C. and neighboring Fairfax County.

References

External links 
 Ballston Quarter official website
 Forest City Enterprises Ballston Common Mall webpage
 Ballston Common Mall Stores

1951 establishments in Virginia
Buildings and structures in Arlington County, Virginia
Shopping malls established in 1951
Shopping malls in the Washington metropolitan area
Shopping malls in Virginia
Tourist attractions in Arlington County, Virginia